The 1972 Ohio Bobcats football team was an American football team that represented Ohio University in the Mid-American Conference (MAC) during the 1972 NCAA University Division football season. In their 15th season under head coach Bill Hess, the Bobcats compiled a 3–8 record (1–4 against MAC opponents), finished in sixth place, and were outscored by all opponents by a combined total of 321 to 185.  They played their home games in Peden Stadium in Athens, Ohio.

Schedule

References

Ohio
Ohio Bobcats football seasons
Ohio Bobcats football